The national football competitions in Belgium were cancelled during 1939–40 season because of the upcoming World War II. However, the Belgium national football team played two official games during the season, both against the Netherlands.

Overview
A Premier Division was started in the 1939-40 season but was stopped on May 10, 1940, when the Battle of Belgium started. Liersche SK was then leader after 9 games on 26 were played.

National team

* Belgium score given first

Key
 H = Home match
 A = Away match
 N = On neutral ground
 F = Friendly
 o.g. = own goal

References